Easter Ellen Cupp was the first woman to get a Ph.D. in oceanography from Scripps Institution of Oceanography. She is known for her work on diatoms.

Education and career 
Cupp was born on March 30, 1904, which was the day Easter holiday is celebrated, in Neola, Iowa.

In 1910 she moved to Whittier, California where she would later attend college. Cupp received an undergraduate degree from Whittier College (1926), and in 1927 she moved to Berkeley where she received a master's degree from the University of California (1928). From 1929 until 1934 she worked as a research assistant at the Scripps Institution of Oceanography. In 1934 she earned her Ph.D. from Scripps Institution of Oceanography with her research on diatoms. Oceanography was a new degree at the time, and Cupp was one of only five people with a Ph.D. in oceanography at the time.

Cupp both conducted research at Scripps and taught classes in phytoplankton ecology with W.E. Allen who had been her graduate advisor. The director of Scripps, Harald Sverdrup, had positive reviews of Cupp's work, but in 1939 he fired Cupp because he decided her research did not match the research goals of the institution. Sverdrup replaced Cupp with Marston Sargent who had arrived at Scripps a year earlier. In later year's Cupp's status as the first woman to earn a Ph.D. from Scripps was forgotten by some, and Naomi Oreskes speculated in 2000 that some were uncomfortable with the firing of Cupp.

After Scripps, Cupp worked with the Navy from 1940 until 1943, and then became a teacher at Woodrow Wilson Middle School in City Heights, California. She retired from teaching in 1967.

Cupp died in 1999.

Research 
Cupp is known for her research on diatoms, and she published a guide to diatoms found in the western United States, and other locations. She published works on different diatoms species she encountered in her investigations. Cupp was also known for her illustrations and collaborated with others on works requiring illustrations.

Selected publications

References

External links 

 Cupp's archived papers in California
 Photograph of Cupp and other scientists at Scripps in 1936

1904 births
1999 deaths
Whittier College alumni
University of California alumni
American women biologists
Scripps Institution of Oceanography alumni
American women educators
American oceanographers
Women oceanographers
20th-century American biologists
20th-century American educators